Fontaine Mica Chapman (born 2 January 1990) is an English badminton player. She started playing badminton at age 6, and joined the England national junior badminton team in 2003.

Early life, training and domestic results 
Her grandad used to coach her every day after school when she was a junior from age 9 and also helped her with summer training. She first represented England at the age of 12 years old at the under 13 Aros Junior Cup in Viby J, Denmark. She was runner-up in the at women's singles event of the English National Badminton Championships in 2013, reached the semi-finals in 2014 and again losing finalist in 2015. In the 2016 edition she captured the English National women's singles title. She played for the Birmingham Lions in the National Badminton League. She won a silver medal with the English National squad at the 2015 European Mixed Team Badminton Championships in Leuven, Belgium.

Achievements

BWF International Challenge/Series 
Women's singles

  BWF International Challenge tournament
  BWF International Series tournament
  BWF Future Series tournament

References

External links 
 

1990 births
Living people
Sportspeople from Coventry
English female badminton players